Chiara Schoras (born 26 September 1975, in Elmshorn) is a German actress.

Biography
Schoras is the daughter of an Italian mother and a German father. She studied dance, singing and acting at the Centro di Danza Balletto di Roma. Her mentor Franco Miseria, the artistic director of the school, recognized her talents in all three performing arts and promoted her.

As an actress she has worked with directors such as Peter Keglevic and Thorsten Näter and Carola Spadoni, and Carlo Rola, Francesco Nuti, Martin Gypkens, and Peter Bogdanovich. Her film breakthrough role came in  Vaya con Dios, for which she recorded the title song and was awarded the Bavarian film prize. Her next film was The Cat's Meow.

Chiara Schoras lives in Germany and Italy and has one daughter.

Filmography
 1995: OcchioPinocchio
 1997: Die Schule 
 1997: First Love – Die Liebe ist ein Nadelkissen
 1997: Große Freiheit 
 1997–1998: Girl friends – Freundschaft mit Herz
 1999: 
 1999: Einfach Klasse 
 1999: Picknick im Schnee 
 1999: Racheengel – Stimme aus dem Dunkeln 
 1999: Romantic Fighter 
 1999: : Schiff der Verdammten 
 2000: 
 2000: Neonnächte 
 2000: : Ein Mann ein Wort 
 2000: Tödliche Wildnis – Sie waren jung und mussten sterben
 2001: Honolulu  
 2001: Giravolte 
 2001: The Cat's Meow
 2002: Alicia 
 2002: Das Geheimnis meiner Mutter 
 2002: Vaya con Dios
 2003: Rosa Roth – Das leise Sterben des Kolibri 
 2003: Die Eltern der Braut 
 2003: Nachts wenn der Tag beginnt 
 2004: Tatort – Nur ein Spiel 
 2005: Was Sie schon immer über Singles wissen wollten 
 2006: Das Glück klopft an die Tür 
 2006: Meine Tochter, mein Leben 
 2006: 
 2007: Die ProSieben Märchenstunde: Aschenputtel – Für eine Handvoll Tauben 
 2007: Capri You Love? 
 2007: Fast ein Volltreffer 
 2007: Im Namen des Gesetzes
 2007: SOKO Rhein-Main – Das Versprechen 
 2008: Deadline – Blutspur 
 2008: Hochzeitswalzer (Regie: Andrea Katzenberger) 
 2009: Countdown – Die Jagd beginnt
 2009: Kommissar LaBréa – Tod an der Bastille 
 2009: NDR Licht aus! Sketch an! (NDR Sketch-Comedy)
 2009: Tatort – Schwarzer Peter 
 2010-2012: Countdown – Die Jagd beginnt
 2010: Tulpen aus Amsterdam 
 2013: BlitzBlank 
 2013: Danni Lowinski - Alles Plastik 
 2013: Ruby Red
 2014: Der Kriminalist – Auf Sand gebaut 
 2014: Die Hochzeit meiner Schwester
 2014: The Mommy Mafia
 2014: Ein Sommer in Ungarn 
 2014:

References

1975 births
Living people
German film actresses
20th-century German actresses
21st-century German actresses
German people of Italian descent
People from Elmshorn